The Bala Lake Railway (Welsh: Rheilffordd Llyn Tegid) is a narrow-gauge railway along the southern shore of Bala Lake in Gwynedd, North Wales. Another section of the former permanent way is used by the Llangollen Railway. The Bala Lake Railway, which runs on -gauge preserved rolling stock, is a member of the Great Little Trains of Wales.

The railway now has the largest collection of historic narrow-gauge quarry locomotives built specifically for the slate industry in North Wales by the Hunslet Engine Company in Leeds.

History

Standard Gauge
The narrow-gauge Bala Lake railway uses the permanent way of the former standard-gauge GWR Ruabon–Barmouth line. The railway, which opened in August 1868, was built by the Bala and Dolgelley Railway Company. In 1877 it became part of the network operated by Great Western (GWR). In 1896  was redeveloped with the addition of a passing loop and second platform, extended building and a new signal box.

Long-distance holiday charter trains and through freight traffic were diverted on to the Cambrian main line via . Goods traffic finally ceased on 1 January 1968 when the branch at Pontcysyllte was closed.

Narrow gauge
By 1969 the track had been lifted. Reuse of the line as a narrow-gauge railway began when local engineer, George Barnes, saw the potential of the lakeside section for both local and tourist traffic. With the help of Tom Jones CBE, then chairman of Merioneth County Council's Finance Committee, they established Rheilffordd Llyn Tegid Ltd, the first company in Wales to be registered exclusively in the Welsh language.
 
Bala Lake Railway opened on 13 August 1972. Extension work continued throughout this period with the help of local ex-British Rail employees. The line was extended to Llangower by the start of 1973. In 1975 the line reached a new temporary station at Pant-yr-hen-felin. The following year the line reached Bala (Llyn Tegid), now known as Bala (Penybont). There were expansion plans to extend the line into Bala's town centre by 1981 but these plans were abandoned early in that year.

The canopy at Llanuwchllyn was built in 1979 with supports which were made for the Cambrian Railways station at Pwllheli, but were relocated to Aberdovey in 1907 when Pwllheli station was moved. The stations along the line are:
Llanuwchllyn, includes the main buildings, cafe, workshops and railway offices.
Pentrepiod Halt, an operational request stop.
Glan Llyn Halt, a limited-use station, open only during the Halloween and Santa Special train services.
Llangower, principal intermediate station that all trains stop at. It has a passing loop for two-train services.
Bryn Hynod Halt, a request stop that closed in 2011 (platform demolished in February 2012).
Bala (Penybont), terminus located near the town of Bala.

The company now has the largest collection of historic narrow-gauge quarry locomotives built by the West Yorkshire Hunslet Engine Company specifically for the North Wales' slate industry.

Llanuwchllyn Heritage Centre 
The Llanuwchllyn Heritage Centre is a museum of Welsh narrow-gauge railway located at Llanuwchllyn railway station. It won the 2020 Railway Heritage Association award for Outstanding Visitor Attraction. Exhibits on display include Hunslet Engine Company locomotive Nesta and a replica of Lord Penrhyn's private carriage, both from the Penrhyn Quarry Railway. It also houses locomitves that are not currently in use which frees up spaces in the running shed and has a variety of exhibits relating to the quarry industry.

Developments and expansion
In 2010, the company revived plans to complete the final  of the railway to Bala town centre. The Red Dragon Project, under the auspices of the Bala Lake Railway Trust, has been established to build the £2.5 million extension.

The plans also include: a new engine shed, a visitor centre, the rebuilding of the carriage shed, which was completed in 2019, and a new set of carriages.

In March 2017, the Trust announced that it had acquired land required in Bala for the new railway terminus.
In October 2019, the Trust purchased land from Bala Rugby Club for the extension of the line. A further area of land adjacent to the new station site was acquired in 2022 and will be used for sidings.

Over the weekend of 12 and 13 June 2021 the 'Bala Rerailed' event was held on the site of the new station in Bala using Winifred and a Penrhyn coach to provide rides to the public.

The railway turned 50 in 2022 and staged a variety of events. These included: 'Bala at 50' over the May Day Bank Holiday, complete with the launch of a pictorial album "Bala Lake Railway, The First 50 Years, 1972 - 2022"; the '50th Anniversary' on 13 August; and a 'Gala' over August Bank Holiday.

Rolling stock

Steam locomotives currently in use or stored on the line are:
'Maid Marian, works number 822 (in use). Arrived on the line 1975. It has twice undergone overhaul supported by her owners, the Maid Marian Locomotive Fund.
 'Holy War, works number 779 (under overhaul). Arrived on the line 1975, serviceable 1979.
 'Alice, works number 780 (under overhaul). Bought initially for spares for Holy War, restored to its own right in 1994.
 '''Winifred, works number 364 (in use). Was repatriated to the UK from a warehouse at the Indianapolis Motor Speedway USA in April 2012. Was restored to working condition in 2015.
 'George B, works number 680 (in use). Entered service in April 2017.
Avonside, works number 1909 (pending restoration). Arrived from Queensland Australia Oct 2020
 'Dorothy, Bagnall works number 1568 (pending restoration). Arrived July 2021

Most of the locos were built by the Hunslet Engine Company for the Dinorwic and Penrhyn Quarries. The numerous Hunslet slate quarry steam locomotives have led the railway to market itself as the home of the Hunslet.

Until late 2011, ex Southam Cement Works Peckett 'Triassic' was stored on the Bala Lake Railway, was relocated to the Statfold Barn Railway during the overhauls of Winifred and George B due to storage space issues, but returned in Summer 2016.

The four main diesel locomotives are: 
 'Meirionydd, a Bo-Bo diesel-hydrostatic locomotive built by Severn Lamb of Stratford-upon-Avon in 1973, and based on a Western class standard-gauge locomotive outline.
 Trigger ('Bob Davies'), a Baguley Drewery, works no. 780, which is the railway's main standby diesel, used to haul out of season trains, for yard shunting and goods or works train haulage, which was built as 2 ft 6in gauge for the Royal Navy at Fishguard, purchased by Pete Briddon's Yorkshire Engine Company, regauged to 600mm gauge, and named 'Bob Davies' in honour of a remarkable local railwayman.
 'Chilmark''', Ruston & Hornsby, works no. 194771, the oldest of the railway's diesels (a 40DL diesel mechanical 3-speed built in 1939 for the Air Ministry), used by the Royal Air Force for hauling explosives and ammunition at RAF Chilmark , Wiltshire.
 'Lady Madcap, a Ruston & Hornsby 20DL, which sees only occasional use for light shunting and ballast ploughing.

A new addition to the fleet is a track maintenance trolley in the style of a standard-gauge Wickham trolley.

Current and former locomotives

See also 
British narrow-gauge railways

References

External links 

 Bala Lake Railway
 Llanuwchllyn Heritage Centre` 
 

Heritage railways in Gwynedd
Heritage railways in Snowdonia
Narrow gauge railways in Gwynedd
Narrow gauge railways in Snowdonia
2 ft gauge railways in Wales
Articles containing video clips